Lincoln Business College was a business college located in Lincoln, Nebraska.  It was founded in 1884, and by 1925 had merged with the Nebraska School of Business to become the Lincoln School of Commerce.  It later became Hamilton College, Kaplan University, and its ultimate successor is now the Lincoln branch of Purdue University Global.

History

The school was founded in 1884 by F.F. Roose.  Its original location was in an office building at the corner of Eleventh and O Streets.  It subsequently moved to the Oliver Building at Thirteenth and P streets, where it remained for 16 years.  On 1914, it moved to a new building on the northwest corner of Fourteenth and P Streets.  E.C. Bigger was president of the college in the 1910s.

By 1925, the Lincoln Business College and Nebraska School of Business (a former location of Brown's Business College) were merged and became the Lincoln School of Commerce.  The school's old building on 14th Street was still standing as of 2010 and was occupied by a printing business.

Later history

In April 1997, many years after the school relocated to K Street in the 1960s, the Lincoln School of Commerce was acquired by Educational Medical, Inc.  Educational Medical (renamed as Quest Education Corporation) was acquired by Kaplan, Inc., in 2000, and in 2004 the school was renamed the Lincoln campus of Iowa-based Hamilton College.  In October 2007, all of the Hamilton campuses were merged into Kaplan University.

Athletics
The Lincoln School of Commerce competed in college athletics as part of the National Junior College Athletic Association. Following the name change to Hamilton College, the school's teams were known as the Hamilton Aliens.

Notable alumni
 Samuel Roy McKelvie (1901), Governor of Nebraska (1919-1923)
 Theodore C. Diers, Wyoming state representative and senator

References

Defunct private universities and colleges in Nebraska
Educational institutions established in 1884
1884 establishments in Nebraska
Schools in Lincoln, Nebraska